Conrado Porta (born 20 June 1958) is an Argentine former swimmer. He competed in two events at the 1976 Summer Olympics.

References

External links
 

1958 births
Living people
Argentine male swimmers
Olympic swimmers of Argentina
Swimmers at the 1976 Summer Olympics
Pan American Games competitors for Argentina
Swimmers at the 1979 Pan American Games
Place of birth missing (living people)
20th-century Argentine people